Indiranagar, is a station on the Purple Line of the Namma Metro in Bangalore, India. It is located on CMH Road in the Indiranagar locality of the city. It was opened to the public on 20 October 2011.

Station layout

Entry/exits
There are three entry/exit points – A, B and C. Commuters can use either of the points for their travel.

Entry/exit point A: towards Raghavendra Swamy Mutt
Entry/exit point B: towards ESI Hospital
Entry/exit point C: towards ESI Hospital
Lift with wheelchair accessibility has been provided for both entry/exit points B and C

See also
List of Namma Metro stations
Transport in Karnataka
List of metro systems
List of rapid transit systems in India
Bangalore Metropolitan Transport Corporation

References

External links

 Bangalore Metro Rail Corporation Ltd. (Official site) 
 UrbanRail.Net – descriptions of all metro systems in the world, each with a schematic map showing all stations.

Namma Metro stations
Railway stations in India opened in 2011
2011 establishments in Karnataka
Railway stations in Bangalore